HSwMS Kalmar (K23) is a Swedish Navy , named after the Swedish city of Kalmar.

Development and design 
The Göteborg class is a class of corvettes in the Swedish Navy, built between 1986 and 1993. The class was originally designed to destroy Soviet submarines and surface vessels, and is armed with eight RBS-15 anti-ship missiles, torpedoes, one 57 mm cannon and one 40 mm cannon.

HSwMS Sundsvall and HSwMS Gävle will receive modification in 2019–2020. After the modification the corvettes will be named Gävle class.

Construction and career 
The ship was launched on 1 November 1990 at Karlskrona and entered naval service on 1 September 1991.

References 

Göteborg-class corvettes
Corvettes of Sweden
1990 ships
Ships built in Sweden